Eduard Franz Sekler (30 September 1920 – 1 May 2017) was an architectural historian and Osgood Hooker Professor of Visual Art Emeritus and professor of architecture emeritus at Harvard University.

Biography
A native of Vienna, Eduard Sekler earned his professional degree with distinction in architecture from its Vienna University of Technology, before studying under Rudolf Wittkower at the School of Planning and Regional Research in London, and receiving his PhD in the history of art at London University's Warburg Institute. Sekler came to Harvard in 1960, at the invitation of Josep Lluis Sert, later co-founding (along with Albert Szabo) the university's Visual and Environmental Studies department in 1968.

Outside of his explicit professorial duties, Sekler was active in efforts to preserve the cultural and architectural heritage of Nepal's Kathmandu Valley. After first visiting in 1962, he made multiple return trips to the valley in association with UNESCO and led the production of plans to safeguard the valley's heritage from development and population pressures. In 1990 he founded the Kathmandu Valley Preservation Trust (KVPT), and later served as an honorary member of its board of directors.

Sekler died on 1 May 2017 in Cambridge, Massachusetts.

Selected writings

See also

References

External links

Kathmandu Valley Preservation Trust

1920 births
2017 deaths
American architecture writers
American male non-fiction writers
American architectural historians
Harvard University faculty
Members of the European Academy of Sciences and Arts
Austrian emigrants to the United States
Writers from Vienna